Pickeringite is a magnesium aluminium sulfate mineral with formula MgAl2(SO4)4·22(H2O). It forms a series with halotrichite.

It forms as an alteration product of pyrite in aluminium rich rocks and in coal seams.
It also occurs in pyrite rich hydrothermal ore deposits in arid regions. It forms in fumaroles and in caves. It occurs with kalinite, alunogen, epsomite, melanterite, copiapite and gypsum.

It was first described in 1844 for an occurrence in Cerros Pintados, Pampa del Tamarugal, Iquique Province, Tarapacá Region, Chile. It was named for American linguist and philologist John Pickering (1777–1846).

References

Sulfate minerals
Monoclinic minerals
Minerals in space group 14